Cheongdam-dong is a ward of Gangnam District in Seoul, South Korea. The area is best known in South Korea as an affluent neighborhood populated by a disproportionately high number of high-income individuals and for having some of the most expensive real estate in the country. It is known as an upmarket shopping area, with the main shopping street dubbed Cheongdam Fashion Street. Along with Apgujeong's Rodeo Street in Apgujeong-dong and Garosu-gil in Sinsa-dong, which are connected by the main Apgujeong-ro, they are seen as fashionable and trendsetting destinations.

Characteristics

This area was originally named Chungsutgol which means clean water valley, for a clean pond that existed here during the Joseon Dynasty. Until Joseon Dynasty and the Japanese Colonial Era in the early 20th century, it was a part of Gyeonggi Province which currently indicates the outskirt of Seoul, the capital city of Republic of Korea. On January 1, 1963, Cheongdam-dong was incorporated into Seoul. On October 1, 1973, it became one of the 26 dong (neighborhoods) of the Gangnam District or Gangnam-gu. Gangnam-gu is one of the 25 gu (gu refers to local government district in Korea) in Seoul. Since 1988, Cheongdam-dong has been divided into two sub-regions: Cheongdam 1 dong and Cheongdam 2 dong. 

Cheongdam-dong was underdeveloped up till 10 years ago, during which time, galleries moved to this area. It formed the existing gallery street, near the Galleria Department Store in Apgujeong-dong towards Cheongdam Park. Apart from galleries and luxury shopping the area also has high-end restaurants, bars, clubs, cafes and beauty salons; and known as an upscale residential area, especially for Korean celebrities such as actors and K-pop artists.
 
The 760-meter-long section of main street Apgujeong-ro, that runs from Apgujeongrodeo Station at Galleria Department Store to Cheongdam crossroad, has been dubbed the 'Cheongdam Fashion Street' or 'Cheongdamdong Street of Luxury Goods'. It is lined with stores of luxury brands, such as Ermenegildo Zegna, Salvatore Ferragamo, Louis Vuitton, Prada, Burberry, as well as outlets for 3.1 Phillip Lim, Martin Margiela and Tory Burch and Korean designer Son Jung-wan.

Attractions

The area is the location for the headquarters of K-pop management companies S.M. Entertainment, Cube Entertainment, and J. Tune Entertainment, and was the location of the old building for JYP Entertainment, before it was moved near the Olympic Park, which is still in Gangnam District. Since January 2012, the area is also home to FNC Entertainment, who moved into their own company offices, separate from their parent company in Mnet Media Building in neighbouring Apgujeong-dong. The MCM Haus flagship store is also located in the area. One half of the multi-colour facade is designed by British artist Richard Woods, while the other half of the exterior is decorated with individually numbered brass plates.  It also has an Italian restaurant in the basement, furnished with Woods' designs.

Shopping and dining complex 10 Corso Como, opened in 2008, opposite the Galleria Department Store. Also in September 2008, French jeweler Cartier opened its first flagship store in South Korea, named Cartier Maison, located on Apgujeong-ro, with its facade inspired by Korean Bojagi wrapping cloth. Helmed by Managing Director Philippe Galtie, he said It was the largest in Korea and at the time of opening it was the seventh largest in the world.

In June 2012, luxury bridal gown designer Vera Wang opened her third global and first Asian flagship store 'Vera Wang Bridal Korea', helmed by President Jung Mi-ri, in Cheongdam-dong.

In media
 5 March 2012: Shinhwa comeback press conference after a four-year hiatus, where they served mandatory military service, was held at CGV Cheongdam-dong, which was also streamed live by Mnet Media to 200 countries.
 In December 2012, the area was the setting for SBS weekend drama series, Cheongdam-dong Alice. It stars Moon Geun-young, Park Si-hoo, So Yi-hyun and Kim Ji-seok, and is based on the novel, Cheongdamdong Audrey.
 In May 2013, the 10 Corso Como store was used as a filming location for the music video of Psy's 2013 single "Gentleman".
In 2018, Seungri filmed his Netflix sitcom/mockumentary YG Future Strategy Office outside the old JYP Entertainment building, which was the final variety show/sitcom that featured the building.

Transportation
There are mainly three types of public transportation running in and through Cheongdam-dong: Bus, Subway, and Taxi. An electronic pre-paid card called T-money can be typically used for all three types of transportation, in addition to credit cards and cash. For more information about getting around Cheongdam-dong, visit the official Korea Tourism webpage.

Bus: Buses of four colors run in Cheongdam-dong, just like in the rest of Seoul. Bus lines that pass through Cheongdam-dong include: 143, 146, 2415, 3414, 3011, 9407, 9507, and many more.
Subway: Three main subway stations in Cheongdam-dong are Cheongdam station, Apgujeong Rodeo station, and Gangnam-gu Office Station. Subway lines that pass through this area are Subway Line 7 and the Bundang Line. 
Taxi: An equivalent to Uber in Cheongdam-dong along with many parts of Korea today, is KakaoTaxi.

Education
 Cheongdam Elementary School
 Eonbuk Elementary School
 Cheongdam Middle School
 Cheongdam High School
 Youngdong High School

See also
 Shopping in Seoul
 Fashion in South Korea
 Gangnam District

References

External links 
 Cheongdam-dong at Life in Korea
 Cheongdam-dong at Gangnam-gu official website

Neighbourhoods in Gangnam District
Shopping districts and streets in South Korea
Tourist attractions in Seoul